The brown firefinch (Lagonosticta nitidula) is a common species of estrildid finch found in Southern Africa. It has an estimated global extent of occurrence of 1,300,000 km2.

It is found in Angola, The Democratic Republic of the Congo, Zambia, southern Tanzania and northern areas of Namibia, Botswana and Zimbabwe. The IUCN has classified the species as being of least concern.

References

External links
 Species text in The Atlas of Southern African Birds
BirdLife International species factsheet

brown firefinch
Birds of Central Africa
brown firefinch